Andriamirado Aro Hasina Andrianarimanana (born 21 April 1991), commonly known by the nickname Dax, is a Malagasy footballer who plays as a midfielder. He plays for the national team and Black Leopards in South Africa.

Club career
In August 2018 Andrianarimanana made the move to Kaizer Chiefs. The transfer was a controversial one as his former club Fosa Juniors FC insisted that the player was still under contract with their club, while the Kaizer Chiefs' staff said that they were under the impression that Andrianarimanana was a free agent. Andrianarimanana signed a two-year deal with the club.

International career
Andrianarimanana played at the 2017 and 2018 COSAFA Cup, in the latter competition he was named player of the tournament.

Career statistics

International

International goals
Scores and results list Mozambique's goal tally first.

Honours

Club
Fosa Juniors
 Coupe de Madagascar : 2017 

Kaizer Chiefs
 Nedbank Cup : Runner-up: 2019

Individual

Kaizer Chiefs
 Best Squad (1) : ABSA Premiership 2019

National Team
Man of the Match Mozambique group A (1) : COSAFA CUP 2018 
Man of the Match South Africa Quarter-finals (1) : COSAFA CUP 2018 
best player of the tournament (1) : COSAFA CUP 2018 
Knight Order of Madagascar: 2019

Record

First Malagasy player elected best player of the COSAFA cup : 2018

References

1991 births
Living people
Malagasy footballers
Madagascar international footballers
Malagasy expatriate footballers
Malagasy expatriate sportspeople in South Africa
Expatriate soccer players in South Africa
Fosa Juniors FC players
Kaizer Chiefs F.C. players
Black Leopards F.C. players
South African Premier Division players
Association football midfielders
2019 Africa Cup of Nations players
People from Antananarivo
Recipients of orders, decorations, and medals of Madagascar
Madagascar A' international footballers
2022 African Nations Championship players